Lorane is a census-designated place (CDP) in Exeter Township, Berks County, Pennsylvania. The population was 4,236 at the 2010 census. Located on the Schuylkill River, US Route 422 runs through the town.

History
Lorane was originally called Exeter Station, until the great Exeter train wreck of 1899 prompted a name change. The present name most likely was derived from Lorraine, in France. A post office was established at Exeter Station in 1861, the post office was renamed Lorane in 1900, and remained in operation until it was discontinued in 1955.

Geography
Lorane is located at  (40.294389, -75.852656).

Demographics

At the 2000 census, there were 2,994 people, 1,160 households, and 864 families living in the CDP. The population density was 1,899.6 people per square mile (731.6/km). There were 1,206 housing units at an average density of 765.2/sq mi (294.7/km).  The racial makeup of the CDP was 96.46% White, 1.97% African American, 0.10% Native American, 0.60% Asian, 0.03% Pacific Islander, 0.13% from other races, and 0.70% from two or more races. Hispanic or Latino of any race were 1.34%.

There were 1,160 households, 31.7% had children under the age of 18 living with them, 64.3% were married couples living together, 7.0% had a female householder with no husband present, and 25.5% were non-families. 21.4% of households were made up of individuals, and 11.4% were one person aged 65 or older. The average household size was 2.58 and the average family size was 3.01.

The age distribution was 23.6% under the age of 18, 6.5% from 18 to 24, 29.2% from 25 to 44, 26.0% from 45 to 64, and 14.7% 65 or older. The median age was 40 years. For every 100 females, there were 95.7 males. For every 100 females age 18 and over, there were 92.9 males.

The median household income was $56,303 and the median family income  was $61,673. Males had a median income of $40,821 versus $34,327 for females. The per capita income for the CDP was $22,920. About 2.5% of families and 4.3% of the population were below the poverty line, including 4.3% of those under age 18 and 8.6% of those age 65 or over.

Parks and Recreation
Lorane's only park is Lorane Hollow Park on Lorane Hollow Park Drive.

References

Census-designated places in Berks County, Pennsylvania
Census-designated places in Pennsylvania